Variovorax boronicumulans is a Gram-negative, catalase- and oxidase-positive, non-spore-forming, rod-shaped, motile bacterium from the genus Variovorax. Colonies of V. boronicumulans are yellow in color.

References

External links
Type strain of Variovorax boronicumulans at BacDive -  the Bacterial Diversity Metadatabase

Comamonadaceae
Bacteria described in 2008